The 1927–28 Elitserien season was the first season of the Elitserien, the top level ice hockey league in Sweden. Four teams participated in the league, and IK Göta won the inaugural championship.

Final standings

External links
 1927-28 season

Elitserien (1927–1935) seasons
1927–28 in Swedish ice hockey
Sweden